Jyri Pelkonen (born 21 December 1965) is a Finnish former nordic combined skier who competed during the late 1980s. He won a bronze medal in the 3 x 10 km team event at the 1985 FIS Nordic World Ski Championships in Seefeld.

Pelkonen's best individual finish was 3rd in Switzerland in 1985.

External links

Finnish male Nordic combined skiers
1965 births
Living people
FIS Nordic World Ski Championships medalists in Nordic combined
20th-century Finnish people